I Can Stand a Little Rain is the fourth studio album by Joe Cocker, released in August 1974, and considered to be the singer's finest album in that decade.

Background
In 1973, in the midst of uncertainty career-wise, Joe Cocker teamed up with Jim Price, a trumpet player turned producer, who had previously been member of Cocker's touring band.

"Jim rekindled my interest," Cocker said in an interview for "Blank Space" in 1979. "Jim called and played me 'You Are So Beautiful', he just came round the house and said, 'What's wrong?' And he played me 'I Can Stand a Little Rain,' which turned out to be the title of the album. The two things that kind of re-fired me into work again, and consequently drove me insane in the process."

I Can Stand a Little Rain found the singer working with top songwriters and session players, including Chuck Rainey, Cornell Dupree and Bernard Purdie, as well as future Toto founder members David Paich and Jeff Porcaro. Some of the writers, like Randy Newman and Jimmy Webb, ended up performing on Cocker's covers of their songs. The album is, however, particularly noticeable for the song "You Are So Beautiful", originally released on Billy Preston's The Kids & Me album. Ultimately, it went on to become one of Cocker's bigger hits, reaching No. 5 on the Billboard Hot 100, proving this album to eventually become a hit.

The original idea was that of a double album but A&M did not approve of it. The rest of the songs recorded during the sessions were released in April 1975 on Cocker's next album Jamaica Say You Will, which was not equally successful.

In 2013, "The Moon's a Harsh Mistress" was re-recorded by Jimmy Webb in a duet with Joe Cocker. It turned out to be Cocker's final recorded performance.

Track listing
Side One

Side Two

Personnel 
 Joe Cocker – lead vocals
 David Paich – acoustic piano (1, 8)
 Nicky Hopkins – acoustic piano (2, 6, 7)
 Richard Tee – acoustic piano (3), organ (3)
 Jimmy Webb – acoustic piano (5)
 Peggy Sandvig – organ (6)
 Greg Mathieson – acoustic piano (9)
 Randy Newman – acoustic piano (10)
 Ralph Hammer – guitar (1)
 Ray Parker Jr. – guitar (1, 8, 9)
 Jay Graydon – guitar (2, 4, 8, 9)
 Henry McCullough – guitar (2, 6)
 Cornell Dupree – guitar (3)
 Dave McDaniel – bass (1, 2, 7-9)
 Chuck Rainey – bass (3)
 Chris Stewart – bass (4, 6)
 Ollie E. Brown – drums (1, 8, 9)
 Jeff Porcaro – drums (2, 6)
 Bernard Purdie – drums (3)
 Jimmy Karstein – drums (4)
 Jim Horn – alto saxophone (1, 3)
 Trevor Lawrence – tenor saxophone (1, 3)
 Jim Price – trombone (1, 3), acoustic piano (4), organ (4)
 Mayo Tiana – trombone (1, 3)
 Stuart Blumberg – trumpet (1, 3)
 Steve Madaio – trumpet (1, 3)
 Daniel Moore – backing vocals (1)
 Merry Clayton – backing vocals (2)
 Venetta Fields – backing vocals (2, 4, 8, 9)
 Clydie King – backing vocals (2, 4, 8, 9)
 Sherlie Matthews – backing vocals (2, 4, 8, 9)

Production 

 Producer and Arrangements – Jim Price
 Mostly recorded at The Village Recorder, West Los Angeles, 1973 (Tracks 1 & 7-10) / 1974 (Tracks 2-6).
 Engineers – Mario Aglietti, Rob Fraboni, Rick Heenan, J.J. Jansen, Nat Jeffrey, Carlton Lee, Ken Klinger, Joe Tuzen and Zak Zenor.
 Mixing – Rob Fraboni
 Mastered by Kent Duncan at Kendun Recorders (Burbank, CA).
 Art Direction – Roland Young 
 Design – Chuck Beeson
 Photography – Steve Vaughan

Chart performance

References

1974 albums
Joe Cocker albums
A&M Records albums